Matthew Andrew Geary Freese (born September 2, 1998) is an American professional soccer player who plays as a goalkeeper for New York City FC of Major League Soccer.

Club career
Born in Wayne, Pennsylvania, Freese went through the Philadelphia Union youth academy before appearing on the bench with Union reserve side, Bethlehem Steel, during the 2017 season. Not long after, Freese enrolled at Harvard and played college soccer for the Harvard Crimson.

Professional career

Philadelphia Union
On December 21, 2018, it was announced that Freese would leave Harvard early and join Major League Soccer club Philadelphia Union at the beginning of their 2019 season.

Freese made his professional debut on April 19, 2019, coming on as a 54th minute substitute for Andre Blake in a 3–0 home win against the Montreal Impact.

On November 8, 2020, Freese made his lone start of the 2020 season against the New England Revolution on MLS Decision Day. He made one save and kept a clean sheet as the Union clinched their first trophy in club history, the Supporters' Shield.

New York City FC
On January 27, 2023, Freese was traded to New York City FC in exchange for a guaranteed $350,000 of General Allocation Money, with a possibility of an additional $400,000, as well as a percentage of a future transfer fee.

International career
Freese has represented the United States at the U-19 and U-23 levels. Freese was named to the final 20-player United States under-23 roster for the 2020 CONCACAF Men's Olympic Qualifying Championship in March 2021.

Career statistics

Club

References

External links
 
 

1998 births
Living people
American soccer players
Association football goalkeepers
Philadelphia Union II players
Harvard Crimson men's soccer players
Homegrown Players (MLS)
People from Bryn Mawr, Pennsylvania
Philadelphia Union players
Soccer players from Pennsylvania
Sportspeople from Montgomery County, Pennsylvania
USL Championship players
′Major League Soccer players
United States men's under-23 international soccer players
MLS Next Pro players
New York City FC players